The Remington Model 11-87 is a semi-automatic shotgun manufactured by Remington Arms and based on the earlier Model 1100. The Model 11-87 remains in contemporary production,  years after being introduced in 1987.

Design
The Model 11-87 is a  gas operated semi-automatic shotgun. Upon firing a shell, some of the high-pressure gases from the burning gunpowder are diverted through two small holes under the barrel, forcing the bolt toward the buttstock, which in turn ejects the spent shell. A spring then forces the bolt forward, sending a new shell from the magazine into the chamber. This gas operation has the effect of reducing the recoil felt by the shooter, since the total recoil energy is spread out over a longer period of time than would be the case with fixed-breech shotguns.

The Model 11-87 incorporates a self-compensating gas system design, which allows the gun to operate with a range of loads, from light  shells to  Magnum shells, without any adjustment by the operator. It is manufactured in 12 gauge and 20 gauge; both will cycle -inch and 3-inch shells.

A lightened version of the Model 11-87, the Model 11-96, was offered in the late 1990s in 12 gauge only.

Operation

A 12 gauge model that accepts  shells is marketed as the Super Magnum. This model comes with an extra component on the magazine tube called a "barrel seal activator" that helps cycle lighter loads. The barrel seal activator is meant to be removed when using -inch or 3-inch shells, and installed when using shorter shells.

Some Model 11-87s have interchangeable screw-in chokes; other barrels are available with fixed chokes. Barrels are not interchangeable between the Model 1100 and Model 11-87.

In popular culture
The weapon found widespread notoriety when a sound-suppressed version of it was used by the main antagonist in the Coen brothers' film No Country for Old Men, based on the Cormac McCarthy novel. First developed in 1987, this weapon is an anachronism to the movie's storyline, set 1980.

Users

: Used by numerous law enforcement agencies.

References

Further reading

External links
 
 Remington 11-87 via YouTube

Remington Arms firearms
Semi-automatic shotguns of the United States
Weapons and ammunition introduced in 1987
Police weapons